Thesaurica is a genus of moths of the family Crambidae.

Species
Thesaurica accensalis (Swinhoe, 1903)
Thesaurica argentifera (Hampson, 1913)
Thesaurica notodontalis (Hampson, 1899)

References

Natural History Museum Lepidoptera genus database

Odontiinae
Crambidae genera
Taxa named by Alfred Jefferis Turner